Abenteuer Airport was a German television series broadcast in 1990. It was an airport adventure series; 12 episodes were produced.

External links
 

1990 German television series debuts
1990 German television series endings
Aviation television series
German-language television shows
Das Erste original programming